The Earthling is a 1980 American-Australian adventure film directed by Peter Collinson, and starring William Holden and Ricky Schroder. It was filmed in Australia in 1979, and was the last to be directed by Collinson before his death the following year.

Plot

Patrick Foley goes to the outback while dying of cancer. He declines medicine and is at peace with his decision to die alone in the forest. As he sees a family camping, Shawn Daley discovers his parents losing control of the recreational vehicle and falling to their deaths. Despite having an ethical dilemma, Foley accompanies Shawn. After days of educating survival, they forgive each other. As Foley dies, Shawn continues travelling.

Production
The film was shot from September to October 1979 in the Blue Mountains, Barrington Forest and Warrumbungle National Park. It was reported that Holden and Schroder got along while filming. Schroder named one of his children Holden in honour of his co-star.

Briann Kearney was assistant to the director.

Reception
The film drew greatly mixed reviews, with some critics reviling it, while others praised it. It played to little notice in theatres, but later became something of a daytime staple on HBO and other cable-movie channels in the 1980s. It grossed $72,000 for box office in Australia.

See also
 Cinema of Australia

References

External links
  
 
 The Earthling at Oz Movies
 The Earthling at the National Film and Sound Archive

1980 films
1980 drama films
Australian adventure drama films
1980s adventure drama films
Films directed by Peter Collinson
Films set in Australia
Filmways films
Films set in deserts
Films set in forests
Films about orphans
1980s English-language films
1980s Australian films